was a Japanese theoretical physicist at the University of Rochester. Ōkubo worked primarily on elementary particle physics. He is famous for the Gell-Mann–Okubo mass formula for mesons and baryons in the quark model; this formula correctly predicts the relations of masses of the members of SU(3) multiplets in terms of hypercharge and isotopic spin.

Ōkubo began study at the University of Tokyo in 1949 and received his bachelor's degree there in 1952. He became a graduate student at the University of Rochester in 1954, where he earned his PhD in 1958 with David Feldman as thesis advisor. Afterwards, he was a postdoc in 1959/60 at the University of Naples, in 1960/61 at CERN, and then in 1962 began researching again at the University of Rochester, where he became a professor in 1964 and retired in 1996 as an emeritus professor.

In 2005 he received the Sakurai Prize from the American Physical Society; "For groundbreaking investigations into the pattern of hadronic masses and decay rates, which provided essential clues into the development of the quark model, and for demonstrating that CP violation permits partial decay rate asymmetries".

In 1976 Ōkubo received the Nishina Memorial Prize in Japan and in 2006 the Wigner Medal. In 1966 he was a Guggenheim Fellow and in 1969 a Ford Fellow. He was a member of the American Physical Society and the American Mathematical Society.

Ōkubo died in July 2015.

Works
 Introduction to Octonion and Other Non-Associative Algebras in Physics. Cambridge University Press, 1995

References

External links
 Biography from the University of Rochester
 Okubo on the discovery of the mass formula (pdf file, 92 kB)
 Scientific publications of Susumu Okubo on INSPIRE-HEP

Japanese physicists
1930 births
2015 deaths
J. J. Sakurai Prize for Theoretical Particle Physics recipients
Mathematical physicists
People associated with CERN
Theoretical physicists
Fellows of the American Physical Society